Xinhua Bookstore is the largest and only country-wide bookstore chain brand in China.

History 
Xinhua Bookstore (in ) was originally established as Guanghua Bookstore (in ) in 1937 in Yan'an under the Propaganda Department of the Communist Party of China.  In 1942, Guanghua Bookstore changed its name to Xinhua Bookstore.

The four Chinese letter "Xin-hua Shu-dian" logo was made in brush writing in 1948 by Chairman Mao Zedong.  In 1951, during the First All-China Publishing Administration Conference, it was decided to divide  the vertically integrated operation into the People's Publishing House, Xinhua Publishing Plant, and the Xinhua Bookstore.

On the upper floor of the store, there was a “no foreigners” floor, which sold a large number of various dictionaries and dictionaries that could be copied without permission from Japan, Europe, and North America, despite the state-owned bookstore.

As China's only country-wide distribution channel for magazines, and CDs and DVDs, it plays an important role in mass media, in addition to its dominant position as a bookstore.

In 2006, there were 14,000 Xinhua bookstores in China. Its main store is now in Xicheng District in Beijing.

Xinhua Bookstore has overseas subsidiaries in New York City, San Diego, London, and in Manila.

Multiple distribution channels 

In the larger cities in China, Xinhua Bookstore has opened "Foreign Language Bookstores" (in ) which sell books and CDs for learning foreign languages.  Books published in foreign countries are not widely sold in China and are more expensive than Chinese-language books, but they are available in large cities, though magazines from foreign countries are prohibited for distribution for political reasons.

Xinhua Bookstore's Provincial Publishing Companies have recently begun opening different distribution channels, such as the Northern Book Town (in ) in Liaoning Province and Boku Book Town  in Zhejiang Province.

Competition
 Local and university bookstores which mainly sell textbooks

See also 
 Publishing in China

References

External links 

 Xinhua Bookstore web site in Hong Kong
 Xinhua Bookstore web site in Chinese

Mass media in China
Government-owned companies of China
Book publishing companies of China
Bookstores of China